Copper Basin High School is a public high school in Copperhill, Tennessee. The school is one of two public high schools in the Polk County Schools district, the other being Polk County High School, of which it maintains a rivalry with.

Description
Copper Basin High School primarily serves the area in eastern Polk County known as Copper Basin, including the cities of Copperhill and Ducktown. The school also enrolls grades 7 and 8 at the campus.

Demographics
As of the 2016–17 school year, Copper Basin High School enrolled 329 students. 51.67% of the students were male, and 48.33% were female. The racial and ethnic makeup of the student body was 96.96% non-Hispanic white, 1.82% African American, and 1.22% Hispanic or Latino (of any race).

Athletics
Copper Basin offers football, baseball, softball, boys' and girls' basketball, boys' and girls' golf, and volleyball.

References

Public high schools in Tennessee
Education in Polk County, Tennessee
Copper Basin (Tennessee)